The Big Four Tournament was an annual college basketball tournament played from 1971 to 1981 in Greensboro, North Carolina. The field consisted of the "Big Four" North Carolina Atlantic Coast Conference schools: NC State Wolfpack, Duke Blue Devils, North Carolina Tar Heels, and Wake Forest Demon Deacons. The four previously participated in the Dixie Classic from 1949–1960.

The tournament was held in December, before the holiday season started, and consisted of two rounds. Each team would play one other team.  The two winners then played for the championship and the two losers would play for third place.  The games did not count in the ACC standings, but did count on a team's overall seasonal record, as did their team and individual stats.

The tournament came to an end in 1981, when participating schools and their coaches decided that the extra competition, aggravation of playing top conference rivals a third time each season, and the toll of all but one team getting one or more losses on its record so early in the season, outweighed their share of the gate and media revenues, substantial fan interest, and the chance to test themselves against the best in the ACC without the outcome affecting their conference records.

Games

Championships

 ''All games played at Greensboro Coliseum, Greensboro, North Carolina.

References

External links
 

Recurring sporting events established in 1971
Recurring sporting events disestablished in 1981
College men's basketball competitions in the United States
Duke Blue Devils men's basketball
NC State Wolfpack men's basketball
North Carolina Tar Heels men's basketball
Wake Forest Demon Deacons men's basketball
1971 establishments in North Carolina
1981 disestablishments in North Carolina
Basketball competitions in Greensboro, North Carolina